Pedro António Gutíerrez Daza (born 8 August 1989) is a Venezuelan cyclist, who last rode for Venezuelan amateur team Gobernación de Miranda–Trek.

Major results

2009
 2nd Time trial, National Under-23 Road Championships
2010
 3rd Road race, National Under-23 Road Championships
2011
 1st  Overall Vuelta a Venezuela
 9th Overall Vuelta Independencia Nacional
2013
 3rd Time trial, National Road Championships
2016
 1st  Time trial, National Road Championships
 1st Stage 6 Vuelta a Venezuela
2017
 1st  Time trial, National Road Championships
 1st Stage 9 Vuelta a Venezuela
2018
 1st  Time trial, National Road Championships
 1st  Overall Vuelta al Táchira
1st Stage 2
2019
 10th Overall Vuelta a Venezuela

References

External links

1989 births
Living people
Venezuelan male cyclists
20th-century Venezuelan people
21st-century Venezuelan people